Simonini is an Italian surname. Notable people with the surname include:

Alberto Simonini (1896–1960), Italian politician
Ed Simonini (1954–2019), American football player
Francesco Simonini (1686–after 1753), Italian painter
Peter Simonini (born 1957), American soccer player

Italian-language surnames
Patronymic surnames
Surnames from given names